Shapley is a surname that might refer to one of the following:

 Lieutenant General Alan Shapley (1903–1973), of the U.S. Marine Corps, was a survivor the sinking of the USS Arizona in the attack on Pearl Harbor
 Harlow Shapley (1885–1972), American astronomer, married to Martha
 Martha Betz Shapley (1890–1981), American astronomer, married to Harlow
 Mildred Shapley Matthews (1915–2016), American astronomy writer, daughter of Harlow and Martha
 Willis Shapley (1917–2005), American administrator for NASA, son of Harlow and Martha
 Lloyd Shapley (1923–2016), Nobel-winning American mathematician and economist, son of Harlow and Martha
 Alice E. Shapley, American astronomer

Shapley may also refer to:
 the Shapley Supercluster
 Shapley (crater), a lunar impact crater on the southern edge of Mare Crisium

Concepts in game theory related to Lloyd Shapley:
 Shapley value and the Aumann–Shapley value
 Shapley–Shubik power index
 Gale–Shapley algorithm